Floating bridge may refer to:

Bridges that float on water
 Pontoon bridge
 Submerged floating tunnel
 Vlotbrug, a design of retractable pontoon bridge used in the Dutch province of North Holland

Ferries
 A cable ferry, especially one designed by British civil engineer James Meadows Rendel
 Cowes Floating Bridge
 Torpoint Ferry
 Woolston Floating Bridge

Other uses
 In music, a type of bridge (instrument)
 Fender floating bridge
 Singaporean bridge, a card game also known as floating bridge

See also
 List of pontoon bridges